Igor Ivanov (born 1945) is a Russian politician. Igor Ivanov may also refer to:

 Igor Ivanov (actor) (born 1954), Soviet and Russian theater actor and director
 Igor Ivanov (chess player) (1947–2005), Russian-born Canadian chess player and concert pianist
 Igor Ivanov (educationist) (1923–1992), Soviet pedagogue
 Igor Ivanov (ice hockey) (born 1970), Russian ice hockey player
 Igor Ivanov (rower) (born 1931), Soviet Olympic rower 
 Igor Ivanov (Scouting) (born 1976), Russian Scouting official
 Igor Ivanov (singer) (born 1953), Soviet and Russian pop singer
 Igor Ivanov Izi (born 1973), Macedonian film director and writer